Contemporary Economic Policy is a peer-reviewed academic journal published by Wiley-Blackwell on behalf of the Western Economic Association International, along with Economic Inquiry. The current editor-in-chief is Brad R. Humphreys (West Virginia University). The journal was established in 1982 as Contemporary Policy Issues.

According to the Journal Citation Reports, its 2013 impact factor is 0.482, ranking it 234 out of 332 journals in the category "Economics".

References

External links 
 

Wiley-Blackwell academic journals
English-language journals
Quarterly journals
Economics journals
Publications established in 1982